The Arctic rockling (Gaidropsarus argentatus), also called the silver rockling or Arctic threebeard, is a species of fish in the family Lotidae.

Description

It has two dorsal fins and one anal fin, with the first ray in the first dorsal fin being elongated to form a whisker-like projection. It has 51–53 vertebrae (including urostyle). The upper body is brown-red, its belly pink, there is a blue hue around its head, and the barbels and fin tips are red. The young are silvery in colour, hence the name.

Habitat

Arctic rockling live in the northeastern Atlantic Ocean, in very cold water,  or lower.

Behaviour

Arctic rockling feed on decapod, amphipod, and euphausiid crustaceans, and fish.

References

Lotidae
Fish described in 1837
Taxa named by Johan Reinhardt